Tupãzinho, real name José Ernâni da Rosa (Bagé, October 17, 1939 – São Paulo, February 28, 1986), was a Brazilian football player at the position of striker.

Honours
Palmeiras
São Paulo State Championship: 1963, 1966
Rio-São Paulo Tournament: 1965
Campeonato Brasileiro Série A: 1967, 1967

References

1939 births
1986 deaths
Brazilian footballers
Sociedade Esportiva Palmeiras players
Grêmio Foot-Ball Porto Alegrense players
People from Bagé
Association football forwards
Sportspeople from Rio Grande do Sul